

France
 Riviéres du Sud – 
 Separated from colony of Senegal
 Jean-Marie Bayol, Lieutenant-Governor of Riviéres du Sud (1882–1891)

Portugal
 Angola – 
 António Eleutério Dantas, Governor-General of Angola (1880–1882)
 Francisco Joaquim Ferreira do Amaral, Governor-General of Angola (1882–1886)

United Kingdom
 India – George Robinson, Viceroy of India (1880–1884)
 Jamaica – Sir Anthony Musgrave, Governor of Jamaica (1877–1883)
 Malta Colony – Arthur Borton, Governor of Malta (1878–1884)
 New South Wales – Lord Augustus Loftus, Governor of New South Wales (1879–1885)
 Queensland – Sir Arthur Kennedy, Governor of Queensland (1877–1883)
 Tasmania – Major George Strahan, Governor of Tasmania (1881–1886)
 South Australia – Lieutenant-General William Jervois, Governor of South Australia (1877–1883)
 Victoria – George Phipps, Lord Normanby, Governor of Victoria (1879–1884)
 Western Australia – Sir William Robinson, Governor of Western Australia (1880–1883)

Colonial governors
Colonial governors
1882